The Eastern Zone was one of the three regional zones of the 1976 Davis Cup.

12 teams entered the Eastern Zone, with 10 teams competing in the preliminary round to join the previous year's finalists Australia and New Zealand in the main draw. The winner of the main draw went on to compete in the Inter-Zonal Zone against the winners of the Americas Zone and Europe Zone.

Australia defeated New Zealand in the final and progressed to the Inter-Zonal Zone.

Preliminary rounds

Draw

First round
Malaysia vs. Pakistan

India vs. Thailand

Qualifying round
Indonesia vs. South Korea

Sri Lanka vs. Pakistan

Japan vs. India

Chinese Taipei vs. Philippines

Main draw

Draw

Quarterfinals
Pakistan vs. Indonesia

Philippines vs. India

Semifinals
Australia vs. Indonesia

New Zealand vs. India

Final
Australia vs. New Zealand

References

External links
Davis Cup official website

Davis Cup Asia/Oceania Zone
Eastern Zone
Davis Cup
Davis Cup
Davis Cup
Davis Cup